In My Dreams is a Hallmark Hall of Fame television film. It premiered on ABC on April 20, 2014, and stars Katharine McPhee, Mike Vogel and JoBeth Williams. It is directed by Kenny Leon from a story by Teena Booth and screenplay by Booth and Suzette Couture.

In My Dreams is the last Hallmark Hall of Fame presentation to be aired on a broadcast television network after 63 years. The anthology series has since moved to Hallmark Channel.

Plot

Both Nick Smith and Natalie Russo are single, living in the same city. On opposite sides of a fountain, they are both encouraged to make a wish. Their coins touch underwater, and they both feel odd. 

Natalie's best friend Sharla pushes her to innovate the restaurant she inherited from her mother to increase clientele and make it her own. She brings Mario, a chef from Italy, to revamp the recipes. He is a hot-headed, initially uncompromising chef who Natalie fears will intimidate her regulars. 

Nick's mom Charlotte has been pushing him to get over Jessa, his cheating ex. She is concerned he never has second dates, so regularly sets him up. The latest is Lori Beth, a girl he dated when they were 12. Charlotte gets them tickets to a comedy performance. At work, although a trained architect, Nick is only a draftsman. Frustrated with being underappreciated, he quietly submits his own proposal for the Green Bridge Award. 

Natalie and Nick fall asleep in their living rooms and dream about each other. At the Hayward Fountain, they introduce themselves. They have instant chemistry, but when they touch each other on the shoulder they both awaken.

The next day, as Natalie is preparing desserts for the restaurant, she tells Sharla about the real-feeling dream. She's reminded that Sharla's cousin has expressed interest, but she doesn't care. Sharla is drawn to Mario, but Natalie isn't. He reminds Natalie their mothers had been friends in Italy, and passes on his mother's condolences.

Nick's date with Lori Beth doesn't go well. Meeting outside of the club, he's already wary, as she's over eager, sending hourly reminders, photos of potential outfits and ccing his mother. She continues trying too hard, wanting to reminisce about moments they'd shared 15 years ago. Nick walks her to her car, clearly not interested in seeing her again.  

Again, Natalie and Nick dream together, this time on a rooftop. Standing on the edge, she says she wants to take risks and is tired of playing it safe. He tells her about the bridge he's designed for the contest and she shares an amaretto cookie. Balanced on the roof's edge, when they try to kiss they fall, and both wake to find themselves on the floor.

Natalie tells Sharla about the second dream, that she can't stop thinking about him, and is anxious to go back to sleep to see him again. In their third dream as they stroll all night, they encourage each other's careers. They both admit they are starting to have feelings for one another.

Before Nick can fall asleep, Jessa calls him to kill a rodent, and seduces him, so Natalie doesn't find him. Upset, she decides to avoid sleeping the next night, so she goes dancing with Mario. He kisses her at the end and says their moms always thought they'd be together. Then Nick goes to find her, but is now alone.

Nick dines at Natalie's restaurant but they don't see each other. Finding two little sketches on the floor, one of his bridge, the other of Hayward Fountain, she goes to the fountain. There, she finds the florist she'd bought flowers from five days ago. She tells her, according to fountain mythology, they have exactly seven days to turn their dreams into a reality. When asked if it'd worked for her, she suggests she find a real man and forget the legend.

That night, Natalie meets Nick in their dreams and tells him she can't meet him again as he's obviously not real. She tells him that they only have one night left to fulfill the myth, but she fears it will break her heart, so she vows not to sleep the next night.

At Nick's parents' 40th anniversary, his dad mentions the Hayward fountain legend and his mother tells him to take a leap of faith. Nick finally quits at the arquitecture firm. At the restaurant, Natalie sees a spark between Sharla and Mario and suddenly realises she has to find Nick, although an important critic is there. He simultaneously decides he must find her, so leaves the award ceremony.

Nick arrives to the fountain first, accidentally dropping the invite. Natalie misses him, but picks it up and heads to the ceremony. He decides to hunt her down going to every Italian restaurant in town. Nick finds 
Russos, but Sharla doesn't know where Natalie is. Joe at the ceremony can't help her either. Both go the fountain, find each other and kiss.

The next day, Natalie introduces Nick to the florist.

Cast
 Katharine McPhee as Natalie Russo, a woman who focuses all her time and energy into keeping her family's Italian restaurant open
 Mike Vogel as Nick Smith, a bridge designer and architect trying to cope with a disastrous relationship split and work frustrations 
 JoBeth Williams as Charlotte Smith, Nick's well-meaning meddling mother determined to find him the perfect mate
 Rachel Skarsten as Jessa, Nick's former girlfriend, who returns to win him back
 Antonio Cupo as Mario, a chef in Natalie's restaurant, who is romantically interested in her
 Jessalyn Wanlim as Sharla, Natalie's best friend
Joe Massingill as Joe Yablonski, Nick's best friend
 Giacomo Baessato as Damien, Natalie's waiter
 Erica Carroll as Karen Smith, Nick's sister

Filming
The film was shot in and around Burnaby, British Columbia, Canada, from November 19 through December 20, 2013.

Reception

Critical reception
Brian Lowry of Variety called the idea of the film "dreamy" and added, "Although the story is perhaps more naturally suited to Hallmark's traditional pre-Valentine's Day window, this is one of the more satisfying movies the storied franchise has delivered in some time." Jackie Cooper of The Huffington Post stated, "This movie strikes just the right tone of romantic entertainment. It is semi-lightweight fare for [Hallmark Hall of Fame] but it is a story that entertains."

Ratings
In its original airing, the film was seen by 4.79 million viewers, with an adult 18-49 rating of 1.0.

See also
 Three Coins in the Fountain

References

External links 
 
 Conversation with Katharine McPhee and Mike Vogel
 

2014 television films
2014 films
American fantasy films
Canadian drama television films
Canadian fantasy films
English-language Canadian films
Films shot in British Columbia
Films scored by William Ross
Hallmark Hall of Fame episodes
American drama television films
2010s American films
2010s Canadian films